Grewia oppositifolia is a currently accepted species of flowering plant in the family Malvaceae, native to the Indian Subcontinent. It has many similarities with and may be a synonym of Grewia optiva (which, to add to the confusion, has the synonym Grewia oppositifolia Buch.-Ham. ex Roxb.); certainly they share the same range, habitat, appearance, growth form, common names, and local uses as a source of forage, timber, fruit, and medicine.

References

oppositifolia
Flora of West Himalaya
Flora of Nepal
Flora of India
Flora of Sri Lanka
Plants described in 1824